Russell Stewart Boyd, ACS, ASC, (born 21 April 1944) is an Australian cinematographer. He rose to prominence with his highly praised work on Picnic at Hanging Rock (1975), the first of several collaborations with director Peter Weir.  Boyd is a member of both the Australian Cinematographers Society since 1975 and the American Society of Cinematographers since 2004.

Boyd served as cinematographer for Tender Mercies, a 1983 film about an alcoholic country singer played by Robert Duvall. Boyd largely utilized available light to give the film a natural feeling which director Bruce Beresford said was crucial to the movie. Actress Tess Harper said Boyd was so quiet during filming that he mostly used only three words: "Yeah, right and sure."

For his work on the 2003 film Master and Commander: The Far Side of the World, Boyd won the Academy Award for Best Cinematography. In 2021, he was appointed an Officer of the Order of Australia for "distinguished service to the visual arts as a cinematographer of Australian feature films and television productions" in the Queen's Birthday Honours.

Filmography

Awards and nominations
Australian Film Institute Awards

Australian Cinematographers Society

Other Awards

References

Further reading

External links

1944 births
Living people
Officers of the Order of Australia
Australian cinematographers
Best Cinematographer Academy Award winners
Best Cinematography BAFTA Award winners
People from Victoria (Australia)